"The Little Drummer Boy" is a song by Harry Simeone Chorale.

Little Drummer Boy may also refer to:

Music
Little Drummer Boy Live, an album by Mark Kozelek
"Peace on Earth/Little Drummer Boy", a song by David Bowie and Bing Crosby

Other uses
The Little Drummer Boy (TV special), a stop-motion television special
Little Drummer Boy Challenge, an informal internet competition

See also
Drummer Boy (disambiguation)